Dennis Day (born 1960) is a Canadian artist known for his video works.

Day is known for his video works Oh Nothing, Autobiography, Heaven or Montreal: The Unfinished Video and This Narrative is Killing Me, among others. In 1997, Day received the Bulloch award for Best Canadian Film for Heaven or Montreal: The Unfinished Video at the Toronto LGBT Film Festival. Day's work is included in the collection of the Museum of Modern Art and the National Gallery of Canada.

References

Artists from Toronto
Canadian video artists
1960 births
Living people